Sanwali is a small town in Gram Panchayet Chandpura located in Sikar district of Rajasthan, India, 3 km away from Sikar. The native language of Sanwali is Hindi and most of the village people speak Hindi. Sanwali people use also Marwari language for communication.

The nearest railway station is Sikar Junction railway station.

The nearest airport is Jaipur International Airport.

References

Villages in Sikar district